Óscar Ramón Ruiz Roa (born 14 May 1991) is a Paraguayan professional footballer who plays as a left winger for Juventude, on loan from Bahia.

Club career
Ruiz played in different clubs of Paraguay starting at Libertad, General Caballero ZC, Guarani, Rubio Ñu and Deportivo Capiatá.

On 31 March 2021, Ruiz moved abroad for the first time of his career, signing a three-year deal the Bahia.

International career
Ruiz's first call up was for the friendly against Peru in November 2014.

Honours
Cerro Porteño
Paraguayan Primera División: 2017 Clausura, 2020 Apertura

Bahia
Copa do Nordeste: 2021

References

External links

1991 births
Living people
Paraguayan footballers
Sportspeople from Asunción
Association football wingers
Paraguayan Primera División players
Campeonato Brasileiro Série A players
Club Libertad footballers
General Caballero Sport Club footballers
Club Guaraní players
Club Rubio Ñu footballers
Deportivo Capiatá players
Sportivo Luqueño players
Cerro Porteño players
Esporte Clube Bahia players
Esporte Clube Juventude players
Paraguay under-20 international footballers
Paraguay international footballers
Paraguayan expatriate footballers
Paraguayan expatriate sportspeople in Brazil
Expatriate footballers in Brazil